There is more than one place named Laverton:

In Australia:
Laverton, Victoria is a suburb of Melbourne
Laverton, Western Australia is a town in the goldfields of Western Australia
Shire of Laverton is a local government area in Western Australia

In the United Kingdom
Laverton, Gloucestershire
Laverton, North Yorkshire
Laverton, Somerset